Events from the year 1797 in Austria

Incumbents
 Monarch – Francis II

Events

 - Denisko Uprising
 - Battle of Diersheim (1797)
 - Battle of Neuwied (1797)
 - Battle of Rivoli

Births

Deaths

References

 
Years of the 18th century in Austria